Forest Ray Moulton (April 29, 1872 – December 7, 1952) was an American astronomer.

Biography

He was born in Le Roy, Michigan, and was educated at Albion College. After graduating in 1894 (A.B.), he performed his graduate studies at the University of Chicago and gained a Ph.D. in 1899.  At the University of Chicago he was associate in astronomy (1898–1900), instructor (1900–03), assistant professor (1903–08), associate professor (1908–12), and professor after 1912.

He is noted for being a proponent, along with Thomas Chamberlin, of the Chamberlin–Moulton planetesimal hypothesis that the planets coalesced from smaller bodies they termed planetesimals. Their hypothesis called for the close passage of another star to trigger this condensation, a concept that has since fallen out of favor.

In the first decades of the twentieth century, some additional small satellites were discovered to be in orbit around Jupiter. Dr. Moulton proposed that these were actually gravitationally-captured planetesimals. This theory has become well-accepted among astronomers.

The crater Moulton on the Moon, the Adams–Moulton methods for solving differential equations and the Moulton plane in geometry are named after him.

Moulton was a critic of Albert Einstein's theory of relativity.

He was in charge of ballistics at Aberdeen Proving Ground in Maryland during World War I.

According to Craig A. Stephenson:

Selected publications

He became an associate editor of the Transactions of the American Mathematical Society in 1907 and a research associate of the Carnegie Institution in 1908.  He served for several terms as secretary of the American Association for the Advancement of Science (AAAS), and edited more than twenty AAAS symposia. Besides various contributions to mathematical and astronomical journals he was the author of:  
 An Introduction to Celestial Mechanics (1902; second, revised edition, 1914)
 An Introduction to Astronomy (1906; 2nd, revised edition, 1916)
 Descriptive Astronomy (1912)
 Periodic Orbits (1920)
 New Methods in Exterior Ballistics (1926)
 Differential Equations (1930)
 Astronomy (1931)
 Consider the Heavens (1935)

References

External links
 
 
 
 JRASC 47 (1954) 84 (obituary)
 PASP 65 (1954) 60 (obituary)
  (slides from talk at SRE Inter-Departmental Science Workshop, Aranjuez, Spain)

1872 births
1952 deaths
Albion College alumni
American astronomers
American science writers
Ballistics experts
Members of the United States National Academy of Sciences
People from Osceola County, Michigan
Relativity critics
University of Chicago alumni
University of Chicago faculty